The Order of the Republic is an Egyptian order of knighthood.

History 
The Order was founded in 1953 to celebrate the rebirth of the Republic of Egypt.

Classes 
The order is composed of the following classes of merit :

 First class - Grand Cordon
 Second class
 Third class
 Fourth class
 Fifth class

Insignia 
 The ribbon is green with golden and red borders.

Notable recipients 
 Hamad bin Isa Al Khalifa, King of Bahrain (24 January 1973)
 Omar Sharaf, Egyptian diplomat (February 1973)
 Ginandjar Kartasasmita, Speaker of the Regional Representative Council of Indonesia (1978)
 Sudharmono, Vice President of Indonesia
 L. B. Moerdani, Commander of the Indonesian National Armed Forces
 Charles III, King of the United Kingdom, then Prince of Wales (1981)
 Mohammed Abdel Wahab, Egyptian Music composer
 Mohammed al-Ghazali, Islamic cleric (1988)
 Ihsan Abdel Quddous, Egyptian writer (1990)
 Salah Zulfikar, Egyptian actor and producer
 Ahmed Moharram, Egyptian engineer and politician
 Faten Hamama, Egyptian actress
 Kamal Rifaat, Egyptian military officer and politician
 Mohamed Aboutrika, Egyptian footballer
 Vladimir Alexeyev, Soviet admiral
 Ezz El-Dine Zulficar, Egyptian film director
 Jože Brilej, Yugoslavian diplomat
 Mashhour Ahmed Mashhour, Chairman of Suez Canal Authority
 J. William Middendorf, American diplomat

References and sources 
 World Medals Index, Republic of Egypt: Order of the Republic

Specific

Republic (Egypt), Order of the
Republic (Egypt), Order of the
Awards established in 1953